Krishna Mandir or Krishna Temple may refer to:

 Krishna Mandir, Barohiya, Hindu temple in Uttar Pradesh, India
 Krishna Temple, Islamabad, Hindu temple in Pakistan
 Krishna Mandir, Lahore, Hindu temple in Punjab, Pakistan
 Krishna Mandir, Patan, Hindu temple in Patan, Nepal
 Krishna Temple, Rawalpindi, Hindu temple in Punjab, Pakistan
 Krishna Temple, Sadiqabad, Hindu temple in Punjab, Pakistan

Religious buildings and structures disambiguation pages